Mangilao is a village on the eastern shore of the United States territory of Guam. The village's population has decreased slightly since the island's 2010 census.

Cliffs lie along much of the village's shoreline provide dramatic views, including of Pago Bay along Mangilao's southern coastline, but few of Mangilao's beaches are available for recreational uses. The island's main prison is in Mangilao.

Demographics
The U.S. Census Bureau has the municipality in multiple census-designated places:
Mangilao,
Adacao,
Pagat,
and University of Guam.

Government and infrastructure
The Guam Department of Corrections (DEPCOR) operates the Adult Correctional Facility (ACF), the Community Corrections Center (C3), and the Women's Facility in Mangilao.

The Guam Department of Youth Affairs has its headquarters in Mangilao. The Guam Youth Correctional Facility, operated by the department, is in Mangilao.

The Guam Department of Agriculture has its headquarters in Mangilao.

The Guam Department of Public Health and Social Services has its headquarters in Mangilao.

Education 

The University of Guam, Guam Community College, and Pacific Islands University are in the village.

The Guam Public School System serves the island. Some Mangilao residents are zoned to Captain Henry B. Price Elementary School, which is located in Mangilao. Other residents are zoned to Pedro C. Lujan Elementary School in Barrigada. Some Mangilao residents are zoned to Agueda I. Johnston Middle School in Chalan-Pago-Ordot, while others are zoned to Luis P. Untalan Middle School in Barrigada. All of Mangilao is zoned to George Washington High School, which is in Mangilao.

A Roman Catholic high school, Father Dueñas Memorial School, is in Mangilao. In addition, the Japanese School of Guam, which has day school and weekend supplementary school components, is in Mangilao.

The An-Noor Mosque is also located here.

Government

Populated places 
 Adacao - census designated place
 Asbeco - populated place
 Latte Heights - census designated place

See also 

 Villages of Guam

References

 Villages in Guam